Deltabaculovirus is a genus of viruses, in the family Baculoviridae. Mosquito larvae serve as natural hosts. There is only one species in this genus: Culex nigripalpus nucleopolyhedrovirus.

Structure
Viruses in Deltabaculovirus are enveloped. Genomes are circular, around 80-180kb in length. The genome codes for 100 to 180 proteins.

Life cycle
Viral replication is nuclear. Entry into the host cell is achieved by attachment of the viral glycoproteins to host receptors, which mediates endocytosis. Replication follows the dsDNA bidirectional replication model. DNA-templated transcription, with some alternative splicing mechanism is the method of transcription. The virus exits the host cell by nuclear pore export, and  existing in occlusion bodies after cell death and remaining infectious until finding another host.
Mosquito larvae serve as the natural host. Transmission routes are fecal-oral.

References

External links
 ICTV Report: Baculoviridae
 Viralzone: Deltabaculovirus

Baculoviridae
Virus genera